Mount Colden is the eleventh-highest peak in the High Peaks of the Adirondack Mountains, New York, United States.
The peak was named after David S. Colden, an investor in the McIntyre Iron Works, in 1836.  The peak was briefly renamed "Mount McMartin" the next year, but the older name persisted. The mountain is known for its distinctive Trap Dike, a large crevice running up the center of the mountain, which can clearly be seen from Avalanche Lake.

There are two maintained trails up Mount Colden.  The first, which approaches from the northeast, passes by Lake Arnold before ascending the summit after crossing over several false summits.  This trail was laid out in 1966 to replace a steeper trail which ascended the southeast face of the mountain and which was abandoned by 1975.  The second trail, which is steeper, approaches from the southwest, starting from Lake Colden.  Both approaches can be reached from the popular Adirondak Loj trailhead.  After hiking from the Loj to the Avalanche Lean-Tos, climbers can head southwest through Avalanche Pass and past Avalanche Lake to reach Lake Colden and the trail to Colden from the southwest.  Alternatively, they can head southeast to reach Lake Arnold and the northeast approach.  Lake Colden and the southwest approach can also be reached from the Upper Works trailhead.  Finally, the summit of Mount Colden can be reached by climbing the Trap Dike from Avalanche Lake.  This approach leads to a long slide and a short bushwhack to the summit.  This last approach does not follow a maintained trail, is extremely steep in places, and should be used with caution.

Gallery

Notes

External links 
 
  Peakbagger.com: Mount Colden
  Summitpost.org: Mount Colden
 Trail Guide
  Photos

Mountains of Essex County, New York
Adirondack High Peaks
Mountains of New York (state)